The Huangze River, in Zhejiang Province of East China, is one of the main tributaries of Cao'e River. It was formerly called Wangze Creek (王泽溪). It originates from Xiabo Peak (虾脖尖, elevation 954 meters) at the border of Ninghai and Xinchang counties. Its upper stretch is known as Jugen Creek (莒根溪), then as Guang Creek (广溪) and Heng Creek (横溪), and it becomes known as Huangze River after Changshan Village. It joins the Cao'e River in Shengzhou.

References

Rivers of Zhejiang
Shaoxing